, better known by her stage name Reimy, is a Japanese singer-songwriter and composer. She has collaborated with Japanese movie producer Shunji Iwai on several soundtracks.

Discography

Albums
 Reimy (1984)
 "R" (1984)
 Pansy (1985)
 Reimy Brand (Best-of album, 1986)
 My Sanctuary (1986)
 Endless Plus Version (1987)
 Smooth Talk (1988)
 Yes We're Singles (Compilation, 1988)
  (1989)
  (1990)
  (1991)
 The Dream of It (Compilation, 1992)
 Magic Railway (1992)
 Nomad (1995)
 Reimy Brand Complete (Best-of album, 2005)

Singles
  (January 1, 1984)
  (May 21, 1984)
  (September 21, 1984)
 "Time Travelers" (May 21, 1985)
  (December 12, 1985)
 "Just Only You" (July 25, 1986)
  (November 1, 1986)
 "Fa・ri・ra" (June 25, 1987)
 "Speed of Light"  (1988)
  (February 25, 1989)
 "Angel" (June 1, 1989)
  (October 25, 1989)
 "Dear Tess" (February 21, 1990)
 "Two of Us" (June 1, 1990)
  (December 1, 1990)
 "Everlasting Love" (March 1, 1991)
 "Everlasting Love" (English Version) (July 25, 1991)
  (Christmas Version) (October 25, 1991)
  (April 25, 1992)
 "Diamond Wing" (July 25, 1992)
  (November 1, 1992)

Videography
 Reimy (March 21, 1984)
 First Flight (1985)
 My Sanctuary (1986)
 Angel (1989)
  (Compilation video, 1990)
 "Platform" – Magic Railway Films – (1992)
 The Best Video Clips (1993)

References

External links 
  

1965 births
Living people
Japanese women singer-songwriters
Japanese people of Filipino descent
Japanese people of Spanish descent
People from Okinawa Prefecture
Musicians from Okinawa Prefecture
20th-century Japanese women singers
20th-century Japanese singers